Ivan Ostojić (born 26 June 1989) is a Serbian football defender who plays for Russian club Baltika Kaliningrad.

References

External links
 
 Profile MFK Košice

1989 births
Sportspeople from Pančevo
Living people
Serbian footballers
Association football defenders
FK Dolina Padina players
FC VSS Košice players
Spartak Myjava players
Karmiotissa FC players
FK Dukla Prague players
FK Radnički Niš players
Helsingin Jalkapalloklubi players
FK Javor Ivanjica players
FC Baltika Kaliningrad players
Slovak Super Liga players
2. Liga (Slovakia) players
Cypriot First Division players
Czech First League players
Serbian SuperLiga players
Russian First League players
Serbian expatriate footballers
Expatriate footballers in Slovakia
Serbian expatriate sportspeople in Slovakia
Expatriate footballers in Cyprus
Serbian expatriate sportspeople in Cyprus
Expatriate footballers in the Czech Republic
Serbian expatriate sportspeople in the Czech Republic
Expatriate footballers in Finland
Serbian expatriate sportspeople in Finland
Expatriate footballers in Russia
Serbian expatriate sportspeople in Russia